Veniero may refer to:

 Italian ship Sebastiano Veniero, several ships named in honour of Sebastiano Venier
 MV Sebastiano Veniero (1940) (a.k.a. Jantzen, or SS Sebastian Venier), a 6,310 GRT cargo and passenger motor ship, built in Fiume
 Peter Veniero, also known as Verniero (born 1959), American lawyer and jurist
 Veniero Colasanti (1910–1996), Italian costume designer, set decorator and art director
 Veniero's, an Italian bakery that was established in 1894 in New York City

See also 
 Venier